Rosalina Garcia Jalosjos, known locally as Nene Jalosjos, is a Filipino politician from the province of Zamboanga del Norte. She currently serves as Governor of Zamboanga del Norte since 2022, the second woman after fellow Dapitanon Guadalupe "Guading" Adaza to hold the position in the province's history.

Political career
Jalosjos first started her political career when she was elected as member of the Dapitan City Council from 2010 to 2013.

She would go on to run for mayor of Dapitan, and won against Agapito Cardino (who only assumed office in January 2013 after the Commission on Elections nullified her brother then-Mayor Dominador Jalosjos Jr.'s 2010 victory) in 2013, 2016, and in a hotly contested 2019 election against former Dipolog City mayor Evelyn Uy where disqualification cases were filed by the Jalosjos camp to question Uy's residency requirement.

As her term as mayor was to end, she made her run as governor of Zamboanga del Norte where she faced Evelyn Uy again and four other candidates in the 2022 elections. From there, she went on to win the gubernatorial race, and take over the reins from the Uy family since the Jalosjos family's political defeat by the Uy family in 2013.

Personal life
She is the sister of businessman and convicted former First District congressman Romeo "Nonong" Jalosjos, businessman and former Third District congressman Cesar Jalosjos, former First District congresswoman and Piñan town mayor Cecilia "Cely" Jalosjos-Carreon, former Dapitan mayor Dominador "Jun" Jalosjos Jr. (who was reportedly dead in 2019), and former Zamboanga del Norte First District board member Anabel "Bebing" Jalosjos-Garcia.

Incumbent Dapitan mayor Bullet Jalosjos, incumbent representative Romeo Jalosjos Jr., incumbent First District board member Angel Jalosjos Carreon, former Baliangao, Misamis Occidental mayor Svetlana Jalosjos-de Leon, and former Zamboanga Sibugay governor Rommel Jalosjos are her nephews.

References

Living people
Year of birth missing (living people)
People from Dapitan
Governors of Zamboanga del Norte
Mayors of places in Zamboanga del Norte
Politicians from Zamboanga del Norte